Lumar Rural District is a rural district (dehestan) in Central District, Sirvan County, Ilam Province, Iran. At the 2006 census, its population was 6,223, in 1,276 families.  The rural district has 31 villages.

References 

Rural Districts of Ilam Province
Sirvan County